Mawindi is an administrative ward in the Mbarali district of the Mbeya Region of Tanzania. In 2016 the Tanzania National Bureau of Statistics report there were 10,930 people in the ward, from 9,917 in 2012.

Villages and hamlets 
The ward has 2 villages, and 34 hamlets.

 Itipingi
 Itipindi 'A'
 Itipindi 'B'
 Mahango
 Majengo 'A'
 Majengo 'B'
 Mjoja
 Nyamatwiga
 Kangaga
 Angola
 Bimbi
 Chang'ombe
 Imalaya
 Majombe
 Mji mwema
 Mkondo
 Nyamahelela
 Tambukaleli
 Uswahilini
 Manienga
 Chabegenja
 Darajani
 Kanisani
 Mabambila
 Mabanda 'A'
 Mabanda 'B'
 Makondo 'A'
 Makondo 'B'
 Mkandami
 Mkandami 'A'
 Mkandami 'B'
 Nyakasima
 Nyalundung'u
 Isunura
 Kati
 Lupululu
 Luvalande
 Nyangasada
 Uzunguni

References 

Wards of Mbeya Region